James Mullins is the name of:

 James Mullins (American politician) (1807–1873), member of American House of Representatives
 James P. Mullins (born 1928), American military general
 James Patrick Mullins (1874–1965), member of Canadian Parliament

See also 
 Jim Mullin (born 1965), Canadian broadcaster
 James Mullin (1846–1920), of the Fenian Brotherhood